This is list of cases heard before the Judicial Committee of the House of Lords in 2007.

See also

 List of House of Lords cases 2008
 List of House of Lords cases 2009
 2009 Judgments of the Supreme Court of the United Kingdom
 List of United Kingdom House of Lords cases
 List of notable United Kingdom House of Lords cases

References
 

 2007
2007 in case law
House of Lords
House of Lords cases 2007
Cases 2007